"Amazed" is a song by Lonestar from the 1999 album Lonely Grill

Amazed may also refer to:

Music
Amazed (album), a 2002 album by Lincoln Brewster
"Amazed", a song by The Offspring from Ixnay on the Hombre
"Amazed", a song by Poe from Haunted
"Amazed", a song by Kutless from their album It Is Well

See also
 "I'm Amazed", a song by My Morning Jacket
 Maze (disambiguation)